"Boots and Sand" is a song written and recorded by Yusuf Islam (formerly known as Cat Stevens). It appears as a iTunes bonus track on his album Roadsinger (To Warm You Through the Night) which was released on 5 May 2009. The song was also released as a double-A side single together with Roadsinger, on 20 July 2009.

"Boots and Sand" was written by Yusuf after he was denied entry to the US in 2004, and features guest appearances by both Paul McCartney and Dolly Parton.

The track was recorded in several different studios and countries during the summer of 2008, and mixed by Thomas Juth at Kensaltown Studios in London.

References

External links
http://www.discogs.com/Yusuf-Roadsinger-Boots-And-Sand/release/1853242
http://www.theboot.com/2009/01/21/dolly-parton-guests-on-yusef-album/

2009 singles
Cat Stevens songs
Songs written by Cat Stevens
2009 songs